HTV-X1 is the first flight and the technical demonstration mission of HTV-X, an uncrewed expendable cargo spacecraft.  , it is intended to be launched in January 2024 and to resupply the International Space Station (ISS).

Cargo 

In addition to the primary mission of carrying the resupply cargo to the ISS, HTV-X1 will carry the following payloads:
 i-SEEP
 Technology demonstration of lightweight expandable flat antenna
 Mt.FUJI, a technology demonstration for satellite laser ranging
 Microsatellites to be deployed from HTV-X1 after departure from ISS

References

External links 

H-II Transfer Vehicles
Supply vehicles for the International Space Station
2024 in spaceflight